Ephelictis neochalca is a moth in the family Gelechiidae. It was described by Edward Meyrick in 1904. It is found in Australia, where it has been recorded from Western Australia.

The forewings are shining brassy bronze with a rather narrow suffused white costal streak from near the base to three-fourths, extremities attenuated. The stigmata are small and black, with the plical obliquely beyond the first discal. The hindwings are grey.

References

Gelechiinae
Moths described in 1904